Senator Matheson may refer to:
Roderick Matheson (1793–1873), Senator of Canada from 1867 to 1873
Sir Alexander Matheson, 3rd Baronet (1861–1929), Australian Senator from 1901 to 1906
Ivan M. Matheson (1926–2016), Utah State Senator from 1977 to 1989
Senator Matheson (X-Files), a character on The X-Files

See also
Elisha Mathewson (1767–1853), U.S. Senator from Rhode Island from 1807 to 1811
James L. Mathewson (born 1938), Missouri State Senator